The 1895 Columbian Orange and Blue football team was an American football team that represented Columbian University (now known as George Washington University) as an independent during the 1895 college football season. Their coach was unknown as they compiled a 0–1–1 record.

Schedule

References

Columbian
George Washington Colonials football seasons
Columbian Orange and Blue football
College football winless seasons